Norman County is a county in the northwestern part of the U.S. state of Minnesota. As of the 2020 United States Census, the population was 6,441. Its county seat is Ada. The county is in Minnesota's Red River Valley region.

History
The county was created by the Minnesota legislature on March 17, 1881, with Ada (which had been founded in 1874) as county seat. It was named in recognition of the many settlers who came from Scandinavian countries, especially Norway. Another source posits that it was named for Norman Kittson, an early historical figure of the region.

Geography
Norman County lies on Minnesota's western border, abutting North Dakota across the Red River, which flows north along (and defines) the county's west line. The Wild Rice River flows west through the lower part of the county, discharging into the Red slightly north of the county's southwest corner. The Marsh River rises in central Norman County and flows northwest into the Red near the county's northwest corner. The county terrain consists of low rolling hills, carved by drainages and lightly dotted with lakes and swampy areas. The terrain is devoted to agriculture. The terrain slopes to the north and west with its highest point near its southeast corner, at 1,224' (373m) ASL. Flom Township contains a prominent, irregular hill of morainic drift known as Frenchman's Bluff. It rises 150' (46m) above the shoreline of the former Lake Agassis, three miles (5 km) to the northwest.

Major highways

  U.S. Highway 75
  Minnesota State Highway 9
  Minnesota State Highway 32
  Minnesota State Highway 113
  Minnesota State Highway 200

Adjacent counties

 Polk County - north
 Mahnomen County - east
 Becker County - southeast
 Clay County - south
 Cass County, North Dakota - southwest
 Traill County, North Dakota - west

Protected areas

 Agassiz Dunes Scientific and Natural Area (part)
 Agassiz No. 1 State Wildlife Management Area
 Agassiz No. 2 State Wildlife Management Area
 Dalby State Wildlife Management Area
 Faith State Wildlife Management Area
 Home Lake State Wildlife Management Area
 Moccasin State Wildlife Management Area
 Neal State Wildlife Management Area
 Prairie Smoke Dunes Scientific and Natural Area
 Sandpiper Scientific and Natural Area
 Santee Prairie Scientific and Natural Area
 Syre State Wildlife Management Area
 Twin Valley Prairie Scientific and Natural Area
 Twin Valley State Wildlife Management Area
 Vangsness State Wildlife Management Area

Lakes
 Home Lake
 Lockhart Swamp

Demographics

2000 census
As of the 2000 census, there were 7,442 people, 3,010 households, and 2,007 families in the county. The population density was 8.52/sqmi (3.29/km2). There were 3,455 housing units at an average density of 3.96/sqmi (1.53/km2). The racial makeup of the county was 95.30% White, 0.11% Black or African American, 1.73% Native American, 0.31% Asian, 1.13% from other races, and 1.42% from two or more races. 3.05% of the population were Hispanic or Latino of any race. 57.5% were of Norwegian and 21.7% German ancestry.

There were 3,010 households, out of which 30.10% had children under the age of 18 living with them, 57.80% were married couples living together, 5.90% had a female householder with no husband present, and 33.30% were non-families. 31.30% of all households were made up of individuals, and 17.00% had someone living alone who was 65 years of age or older.  The average household size was 2.41 and the average family size was 3.04.

The county population contained 25.70% under the age of 18, 6.20% from 18 to 24, 24.10% from 25 to 44, 23.00% from 45 to 64, and 20.90% of over age 64. The median age was 41 years. For every 100 females there were 98.60 males. For every 100 females age 18 and over, there were 96.80 males.

The median income for a household in the county was $32,535, and the median income for a family was $41,280. Males had a median income of $28,674 versus $20,619 for females. The per capita income for the county was $15,895.  About 7.10% of families and 10.30% of the population were below the poverty line, including 10.70% of those under age 18 and 14.30% of those age 65 or over.

2020 Census

Communities

Cities

 Ada (county seat)
 Borup
 Gary
 Halstad
 Hendrum
 Perley
 Shelly
 Twin Valley

Unincorporated communities

 Betcher
 Faith
 Flom
 Hadler
 Lockhart
 Ranum
 Syre
 Waukon

Townships

 Anthony Township
 Bear Park Township
 Flom Township
 Fossum Township
 Good Hope Township
 Green Meadow Township
 Halstad Township
 Hegne Township
 Hendrum Township
 Home Lake Township
 Lake Ida Township
 Lee Township
 Lockhart Township
 Mary Township
 McDonaldsville Township
 Pleasant View Township
 Rockwell Township
 Shelly Township
 Spring Creek Township
 Strand Township
 Sundal Township
 Waukon Township
 Wild Rice Township
 Winchester Township

Government and politics
Norman County has often voted Democratic. Between 1968 and 2016, the county selected the Democratic candidate in nine of the 12 presidential elections.

See also
 National Register of Historic Places listings in Norman County, Minnesota

References

External links
 Norman County government’s website

 
Minnesota counties
1881 establishments in Minnesota
Populated places established in 1881